Väljas is an Estonian surname. Notable people with the surname include:

Len Väljas (born 1988), Canadian cross-country skier of Estonian descent
Vaino Väljas (born 1931), Estonian politician

Estonian-language surnames